The 2020–21 Marshall Thundering Herd women's basketball team represented Marshall University during the 2020–21 NCAA Division I women's basketball season. The team was led by fourth-year head coach Tony Kemper, and played their home games at the Cam Henderson Center in Huntington, West Virginia as a member of Conference USA.

Schedule and results

|-
!colspan=12 style=|Non-conference regular season

|-
!colspan=12 style=|CUSA regular season

|-
!colspan=12 style=| CUSA Tournament

See also
 2020–21 Marshall Thundering Herd men's basketball team

Notes

References

Marshall Thundering Herd women's basketball seasons
Marshall Thundering Herd
Marshall Thundering Herd women's basketball team
Marshall Thundering Herd women's basketball team